Stonerville is a 2011 American comedy film. Leslie Nielsen played a character simply named Producer, which was his final role before he died. The film was directed by Bill Corcoran. It was written by Kevin Sepe and Tom Alexander.

Plot
Troy "Slam" Slamsky is a viral video guru who is a huge hit on Mespacetube.com. His nagging girlfriend Miranda wants him to take his skills and growing fan base into the real world and get a job in advertising. She is tired of living in their less than modest apartment, and sees Slam's talent as the ticket out. Slam is only interested in making his short movies, getting stoned with his best friend Harlan "Harley" Lovecraft, and someday visiting Cleveland. After a series of disagreements and the discovery that Miranda is two-timing Slam with rich snob Tyler, Slam is suddenly on his own.

He soon encounters the gorgeous Erica. She is a huge fan of Slam and his work. It isn't long before the two are an item. She connects him with her uncle, Johnny Scarano, a gentleman's club owner with mob ties. Slam and Harley go on a full-fledged commercial shooting spree hyping Scarano's club. Slam is suddenly in the money and very much in love with Erica. Slam's produced videos, as well as the ones playing in his mind, are revealed in comedy sketches that are interjected throughout the film.

Cast

 Patrick Cavanaugh as Troy "Slam" Slamsky
 Joey Diaz as Johnny Scarano
 Cameron Goodman as Miranda
 Brian Guest as Harlan "Harley" Lovecraft
 Alex Mauriello as Erica
 Phil Morris as Clay Redding
 Leslie Nielsen as Producer
 Bob Rumnock as Peter Downing, British Man #2
 Pauly Shore as Rod Hardbone
 Preston Vanderslice as Tyler

References

External links
 
 

American comedy films
American films about cannabis
2011 direct-to-video films
2011 films
2010s English-language films
2011 comedy films
Films directed by Bill Corcoran
2010s American films